Plaça Molina is a station of the Barcelona Metro on the FGC-operated line L7 (also known as Línia de Balmes). The station is situated under by Plaça Molina, a square in the Sarrià-Sant Gervasi district. It is connected by an underground pedestrian passageway to the nearby Sant Gervasi station on line L6 of the metro.

The station opened in 1953, with the inauguration of the railway section spanning from Gràcia to Avinguda Tibidabo (still the terminus of the line). The link to Sant Gervasi station opened in 2008.

Because of proximity to street level, each platform has its own street access, with the two platforms being linked by an underpass below the track level.

See also
List of Barcelona Metro stations
List of railway stations in Barcelona

References

External links
 
 Information and photos about the station at Trenscat.com
 Information and photos about the station at TransporteBCN.es

Barcelona Metro line 7 stations
Transport in Sarrià-Sant Gervasi
Railway stations in Spain opened in 1953